El Árbol del Tule (Spanish for The Tree of Tule) is a tree located in the church grounds in the town center of Santa María del Tule in the Mexican state of Oaxaca, approximately  east of the city of Oaxaca on the road to Mitla. It is a Montezuma cypress (Taxodium mucronatum), or ahuehuete (meaning "old man of the water" in Nahuatl). It has the stoutest tree trunk in the world.  In 2001, it was placed on a UNESCO tentative list of World Heritage Sites, but was removed from the list in 2013.

Dimensions and age
This is slightly wider than the next most stout tree known, a giant sequoia with a  diameter.

It is so large that it was originally thought to be multiple trees, but DNA tests have proven that it is only one tree. This does not rule out another hypothesis, which states that it comprises multiple trunks from a single individual.

The age is unknown, with estimates ranging between 1,200 and 3,000 years, and even one claim of 6,000 years; the best scientific estimate based on growth rates is 1,433–1,600 years. Local Zapotec legend holds that it was planted about 1,400 years ago by Pechocha, a priest of the Aztec wind god Ehecatl - this age is in broad agreement with the scientific estimate; its location on a sacred site (later taken over by the Roman Catholic Church) would also support this.

The tree is occasionally nicknamed the "Tree of Life" from the images of animals that are reputedly visible in the tree's gnarled trunk. As part of an official project local schoolchildren give tourists a tour of the tree and point out shapes of creatures on the trunk, including jaguars and elephants.

In 1990, it was reported that the tree is slowly dying because its roots have been damaged by water shortages, pollution, and traffic, with 8,000 cars travelling daily on a nearby highway.

See also
 List of individual trees
 List of oldest trees

References

External links

 

Individual conifers
Mexican folklore
Religious places of the indigenous peoples of North America
Trees in religion
Tourist attractions in Oaxaca
Individual trees in Mexico
Oldest trees